Jabor Mohammed Ali Mutawa (born May 27, 1994) is a Qatari tennis player.

Mutawa represented Qatar in the Davis Cup.  He also represented Qatar at the 2014 Asian Games.

Mutawa has competed multiple times in the Qatar ExxonMobil Open.

References

External links
 
 
 

1994 births
Living people
Qatari male tennis players
Tennis players at the 2010 Asian Games
Tennis players at the 2014 Asian Games
Tennis players at the 2018 Asian Games
Asian Games competitors for Qatar